Arrows are a six-piece alternative rock band from Bedfordshire, England, forged in 2008 from the ashes of cult dance/guitar band from Philadelphia, Delphian Complex. The band consists of Mark Drake (vocals), Joe Southin (keys/vocals), David Warner (guitars/vocals), Carl Bishop (guitar), Mattie Bennett (bass) and Barry Crook (drums). Following a prolonged period of writing and rehearsing, Arrows began to gig extensively across the UK in March 2008, firmly closing the door on their previous entity's past, with a new, strongly contrasting sound.

The followed this heavy touring by stepping back into the studios in July 2008, recording two songs, "A New Way To Get By" and "Song" at Lost Boys Recording Studio in Bedfordshire, which they co-produced with Nick Mailing. The demo became an instant success, securing them airplay on local and national radio, and bringing them to the attention of a much wider audience. This summer the band played the BBC Introducing and Love Music Hate Racism festivals.

History

Delphian Complex and resurrection
Arrows first incarnation, Delphian Complex, was formed in the winter of 2004, the result of four recent graduates who had been friends since school (Mark Drake, Carl Bishop, Joe Southin and David Warner) returning home and disillusioned by their surroundings and prospects. Following the recruitment of friend Chris Eagling on bass and a mutual friend Matt Bennett on drums, and a series of intense song writing and rehearsal sessions, the band released their debut demo in November of the same year. The demo, "Bite The Hand" was recorded at Bark Studios in Walthamstow with producer Brian O’Shaughnessy, who had previously worked with My Bloody Valentine, Denim and Delphian Complex favourites, Primal Scream. Tracks included on the debut recording were "Bite The Hand", "Narcolepsy Ballad" and "All That Remains". The demo got them their first gigs, at The Angel in Bedford and Bull and Gate in Kentish Town London, where they played to large, appreciative crowds. The demo was sent to that year's BBC Unsigned competition and won them praise from the judges but the first prize eluded them. Following interest from several record labels, Delphian Complex gigged around the UK for the next year before recording their next demo, "The Delphian Complex" EP, featuring the tracks "Opus", "To Better Days", and "Lay". The demo's long intros and experimental atmosphere meant it was shunned by many radio stations, but won them favour with many other bands and music industry officials; which led to an XFM interview with Clint Boon support slots with Electric 6 for a small tour, and more prestigiously New Order and Primal Scream at the request of the bands themselves. During the next year, the band continued to gig heavily and support big names such as Babyshambles, The Longcut, Alabama 3 and The Fratellis and during this time signed a single deal with cult indie label XXIV Records, whose roster also included Gemma Ray Ritual, Phoenix Drive and Budgie Reef. They went back into the studio to record the three track single "Jack-Knife" which featured the B-Side "Higher State" and a remix of Jack-Knife by producer and DJ Andrew Weatherall. Sold only through London and Manchester independents such as Rough Trade and online stores, the single was deemed a success, nearly selling out its limited 1000 copy release in 3 weeks, but creative differences between the band and the label began to put a strain on the relationship, and at the end of 2006 the band dropped the label. Following this, Matt left the band to go back to university to study music business in reaction to the events that had occurred with XXIV, and a replacement was found in the form of Steve Dowel, a mutual friend and previously of the band The Faculty. The band continued to gig in low key venues and in the Summer of 2007 recorded the experimental dance/rock EP "CREATE.EVADE.INSPIRE.ESCAPE", which also became their and later Arrows’ motto.

2008 to present
During this small run of gigs through 2007 and early 2008, Delphian Complex began to draw musical influence from a much wider range of sources in their songwriting, changing their sound dramatically. Influenced by the artists that first inspired them to make music, the heavy electronic presence that once defined their sound became noticeably absent in their new songs, a move which split audiences. Eventually the band decided that the sound they were making was such a radical departure from everything Delphian Complex had done before, it would be wiser to start from scratch and begin again with the new sound being matched with a new name. Their inspiration for this new moniker arrived when playing their last gig as Delphian Complex in Manchester in 2008 at the Kro2 venue. As the band waited to begin their set, the words to William Blake's "Jerusalem" were adorned on a wall in front of them. The words "Bring me my arrows of desire" rang a chord with the band, and thus the name Arrows was born. The band promptly retreated into obscurity to begin months of writing, rehearsing and recording, which in turn inspired them to return to the studio to record two of the stand out songs that had come from the session, "A New Way To Get By" and "Song". The recording was undertaken in Lost Boys Studios, an old converted barn in Bedfordshire with Nick Mailing who had also recorded the popular "Delphian Complex EP" with the band in their former incarnation. The recording and following writing sessions and "test" gigs, where the band sought to see what reaction audiences gave their new sound were reputedly incredibly intense, such as when they supported Elks at Luton George II in November 2008. At the end of the year Chris Eagling and Steve Dowel left the band amicably for personal reasons. Eventually, Matt Bennett returned to the fold, this time on bass, and the band recruited Barry Crook form the band The Portion to take over drum duties. An intense gigging schedule was immediately put in place, which led to live sessions on BBC Introducing, air play with local radio and appearances at the BBC Introducing and Love Music Hate Racism festivals.

Discography

Singles
 A New Way To Get By EP (2009) recorded by Nick Mailing at Lost Boys Studio, Bedfordshire - Limited edition EP.
 A New Way To Get By
 Song

Unreleased works
 Thorn In Your Side
 Echoes
 Coming Down (Country Tune)
 Templates
 Mouth
 Reverence

Delphian Complex discography

Singles
 Create / Evade / Inspire / Escape EP (limited release) (2007), recorded by Nina, Streatham - Limited edition EP.
 On Fire
 Rat Fight
 Don't Fall
 Running Through Snow

 Jack-Knife EP (2006), Recorded by Tom at The Fortress Studios, London - Limited edition EP.
 Jack-Knife
 Higher State
 Jack-Knife (Weatherall Remix)

 Opus EP (2005), recorded by Nick Mailing at Henhouse Studios, Bedfordshire - Limited edition EP.
 Opus
 Lay
 To Better Days

 Bite The Hand EP (2004), recorded by Brian O'Shaughnessy at Bark Studios, East London  - Limited edition EP.
 Bite The Hand
 Narcolepsy Ballad
 All That Remains

Compilations
 10 Years of Icon, 2007
 I swear I was there, 2005

Unreleased works
 A&E [as Delphian Complex]
 Bite The Hand 2006 [as Delphian Complex]
 Chapters 1-3 [as Delphian Complex]
 So Fly [as Delphian Complex]
 Tony Gubba [as Delphian Complex]
 Bite The Hand (Racket Scientist Remix)
 Bite The Hand (Apex Disco Remix)
 Jack-Knife (Apex Disco Remix)

In popular culture
One of Delphian Complex's songs ("To Better Days") has appeared on a viral advertising campaign for 118-118.com, created by Lurgee.

References

External links
 Arrows on Myspace

English alternative rock groups
Musical groups established in 2004